Kokshenskaya is a rural locality (a village) in Nyuksenskoye Rural Settlement, Nyuksensky District, Vologda Oblast, Russia. The population was 71 as of 2002.

Geography 
Kokshenskaya is located 18 km northwest of Nyuksenitsa (the district's administrative centre) by road. Pozharishche is the nearest rural locality.

References 

Rural localities in Nyuksensky District